Gubtsevo is a rural locality (a selo) in Posyolok Krasnoye Ekho, Gus-Khrustalny District, Vladimir Oblast, Russia. The population was 53 as of 2010. There are 6 streets.

Geography 
Gubtsevo is located 30 km northeast of Gus-Khrustalny (the district's administrative centre) by road. Tolstikovo is the nearest rural locality.

References 

Rural localities in Gus-Khrustalny District